David Bruce may refer to:

Entertainment
 David Bruce (actor) (1914–1976), American film actor
 David Bruce (composer) (born 1970), British composer
 David Bruce (musician), Australian singer, percussionist and composer
 David Bruce (bridge) (1900–1965), American contract bridge player in the 1930s

Science
 David Bruce (physician) (fl. 1660s), Scottish physician
 David Bruce (microbiologist) (1855–1931), Scottish pathologist and microbiologist
 David Bruce (naturalist) (1833–1903), Scottish-American natural history collector

Other
 David II of Scotland (1324–1371), David Bruce, King of Scots, son of King Robert the Bruce
 David Bruce (captain) (1816–1903), British master mariner
 David Bruce (minister) (1824–1911), Presbyterian minister, journalist
 David K. E. Bruce (1898–1977), American diplomat
 David Bruce (brewer) (born 1948), British entrepreneur, founder of the Firkin Brewery pub chain
 David Bruce (ice hockey) (born 1964), Canadian National Hockey League player
 David Bruce (inventor) (1802–1892), American industrialist and inventor

See also
 Bruce LM–5000 Pairs, an American contract bridge competition
 David Bruce Winery, an American winery
 David Bryce (1803–1876), Scottish architect